The grey-crested tit (Lophophanes dichrous) is a species of bird in the family Paridae.

It is found in the Himalayan foothills and southern-central China. Its natural habitats are temperate forest and subtropical or tropical moist montane forest.

References

grey-crested tit
Birds of Central China
Birds of Yunnan
Birds of the Himalayas
grey-crested tit
grey-crested tit
Taxonomy articles created by Polbot